"Got Me Good" is a song by Swedish recording artist Agnes from her fourth studio album Veritas. The song was released as the third single from the album in Sweden on 27 May 2013. After its first week of release the single entered the official download chart in Sweden at 53, this without any promotion.

Background
The song was remixed for the single release. Peter Boström, also known as Bassflow, did the remake; hence the single was called "The Bassflow Remake". Agnes has earlier commented on the song as a "glimpse into the uniquely human habit of falling in love, or cutter, in someone who does not reciprocate the affection." UK blogger Scandipop was the first to announce the single on their website and also being positive about the remix release; "The new version doesn’t stray too far away from the pop magic of the original, which is good. Instead, it just freshens the song up a tad, and adds a certain level of epic dreaminess to the whole thing."

Track listing 
Digital download
"Got Me Good" (Bassflow Remake) — 3:46

Charts

References

2013 singles
Agnes (singer) songs
Synth-pop ballads
Songs written by Agnes (singer)
2013 songs
Songs written by Jonas Quant
Songs written by Vincent Pontare
Songs written by Magnus Lidehäll
Songs written by Miriam Nervo
Songs written by Olivia Nervo
Song recordings produced by Vincent Pontare